WBHK (98.7 FM) is an urban adult contemporary music formatted radio station owned by SummitMedia that serves Birmingham, Alabama.  It is currently ranked by the Arbitron rating system as the nation's highest rated urban adult contemporary station.  98.7 Kiss FM is licensed to Warrior and broadcasts on the 98.7 Megahertz (MHz) frequency at effective radiated power of 39 kilowatts (kW) from atop Red Mountain.  It is owned by SummitMedia along with six other stations, and all share studios in the Cahaba neighborhood in far southeast Birmingham.

The station has an unusually strong signal that broadcasts on a class C1 that can be heard across the majority of North and Central Alabama and even in parts of eastern Mississippi and western Georgia.  WBHK is sometimes mistaken for or confused with the former New York City urban AC with the same moniker, WRKS-FM, 98.7 Kiss FM (now WEPN-FM with an ESPN sports format). The similar musical format and dial position of both stations have allowed them to share on-air liners and even TV commercials—but neither station shares the same corporate ownership.  In 2005, WBHK began broadcasting in IBOC digital radio, using the HD Radio system from iBiquity.

History
98.7 began as WLBI, "Great 98", a 6 kW rimshot hot adult contemporary station licensed to Warrior. The station was assigned the WLBI call letters by the Federal Communications Commission on December 13, 1991. Its tower was on a hill off Arkadelphia Road west of Warrior, and they broadcast from a small trailer also located in Warrior. The station was built by Terry Bentley Lowery and Danny Bentley, both with broadcasting interests in Oneonta, Alabama.

In 1994, the station became known as "98 Lite", and changed to a soft adult contemporary format. In 1995, the station began adding smooth jazz programming and eventually morphed into a smooth jazz format; the station continued to broadcast as "98 Lite".

On July 24, 1996, after many years as a low-rated AC, the station became an urban AC with the moniker and slogan, "98.7 Kiss FM, Smooth R&B and Classic Soul", changing to its current WBHK callsign on July 1, 1996.  With the format change the ratings for the frequency increased.  In 2002, the transmitter was upgraded and moved to Red Mountain after many years of broadcasting from a choppy signal.

On July 20, 2012, Cox Radio, Inc. announced the sale of WBHK and 22 other stations to Summit Media LLC for $66.25 million. The sale was consummated on May 3, 2013.

Station management

 General manager: John Walker
 Program Director: Darryl Johnson
 Marketing director: Justin Ragland

References

External links
98.7 Kiss FM WBHK official website

BHK
Urban adult contemporary radio stations in the United States
Radio stations established in 1991
1991 establishments in Alabama